Tudeh in Iran may refer to:
 Tudeh, North Khorasan
 Tudeh, Taft, Yazd Province
 Tudeh, Nir, Taft County, Yazd Province